Silverbark Ridge is a rural locality in the City of Logan, Queensland, Australia. It is situated along the development corridor south of Brisbane in the Greater Flagstone development area and expected to become a residential area as the city's population increases.

History
Silverbark Ridge is situated in the Bundjalung traditional Indigenous Australian country. 

The origin of the suburb name is from the name of the flora found in the district.

Silverbark Ridge had been approved and designated as a locality within Logan City  by the Department of Natural Resources and Mines in May 2016.

References

Suburbs of Logan City
Localities in Queensland